Albert Ferrer Llopis (born 6 June 1970) is a Spanish retired footballer who played as a right back, and was also a coach.

Having represented local team Barcelona for almost a decade, he went on to appear for England's Chelsea until his retirement. During his spell in his home country he was nicknamed Chapi, and appeared in a total of 221 La Liga matches over nine seasons.

A Spanish international on more than 30 occasions, Ferrer represented the nation in two World Cups and at the 1992 Olympic Games, winning the latter tournament. He started working as a manager in 2010, with Vitesse.

Club career

Barcelona
Born in Barcelona, Catalonia, Ferrer was a pacy and tough-tackling defender. He began his senior career with FC Barcelona B, then served a loan with CD Tenerife in the 1989–90 season, with whom he made his La Liga debut at the age of 19.

Ferrer returned to the first team the following summer and became first-choice right back, remaining as such the following eight years and scoring once in the league. He often partnered another youth graduate, Sergi Barjuán, in the defensive wings.

Ferrer was a key member of the famous Dream Team and, during his time with the Blaugrana, won five leagues, a European Cup, a UEFA Cup Winners' Cup, two domestic cups, four Supercups and two UEFA Super Cups. As the Dutch dominance at the Camp Nou in terms of players was still an important one (the club was coached by Louis van Gaal), he left in June 1998 amongst other greats as Guillermo Amor.

Chelsea
In June 1998, Ferrer signed with Chelsea for £2.2 million. He quickly established himself in the side, helping them qualify for their first ever Champions League in his debut campaign; his new club won the FA Cup the following year (but he missed the final through injury) and reached the quarter-finals of the Champions League; during the run in the latter he played in 14 of 16 games, and scored his only goal in a 2–0 win over Hertha BSC.

A combination of injuries and manager Gianluca Vialli's squad rotation policy reduced Ferrer's opportunities in 2000–01, and he made only 14 league appearances. Chelsea reached another FA Cup final in 2002 – which he again missed, though this time through not being selected, despite playing in the semi-final against Fulham. Out of favour and facing strong competition from younger teammates he played just seven times in his final two years, and left in May 2003 upon the expiry of his contract, totalling 113 overall matches for the Londoners and retiring shortly after at 33.

International career
Ferrer was a Spain international on 36 occasions. His debut came on 4 September 1991 in a friendly win with Uruguay in Oviedo, as La Roja eventually did not qualify for UEFA Euro 1992.

Subsequently, Ferrer was a regular figure in the national side, appearing as starter at the 1994 FIFA World Cup and playing once in the 1998 edition, the 3–2 group stage loss against Nigeria, missing Euro 1996 and 2000 through injury (with Barcelona teammate Sergi on the other flank in all these tournaments).

In 1992, Ferrer was first-choice for the Olympic team that won the gold medal at the Summer Olympics, held in his hometown.

Coaching career
After retiring, Ferrer worked as a color commentator for a number of Spanish broadcasters. In late October 2010, he was announced as new head coach of SBV Vitesse in the Eredivisie, his staff also included compatriot Albert Capellas (formerly youth coach at Barcelona) and former Dutch goalkeeper Stanley Menzo, who left his post at SC Cambuur in order to join the Spaniards.

Ferrer led the side to 15th position, in a narrow escape from relegation. He was subsequently relieved of his duties, being replaced by John van den Brom.

On 17 February 2014, Ferrer was appointed at Segunda División club Córdoba CF. After finishing the season in the seventh place, they defeated UD Las Palmas in the play-off final to return to the top flight for the first time in 42 years.

Ferrer was fired on 20 October 2014, as Córdoba ranked dead last with only four points in eight matches. On 20 June of the following year he was named RCD Mallorca manager, signing a one-year deal; after three wins from 15 second level games, he was dismissed on 30 November.

On 29 August 2017, Ferrer returned to Barcelona as coach of its legends team.

Managerial statistics

Honours
Barcelona
La Liga: 1990–91, 1991–92, 1992–93, 1993–94, 1997–98
Copa del Rey: 1996–97, 1997–98
Supercopa de España: 1991, 1992, 1994, 1996
European Cup: 1991–92
UEFA Cup Winners' Cup: 1996–97
UEFA Super Cup: 1992, 1997

Chelsea
FA Cup: 1999–2000
FA Community Shield: 2000
UEFA Super Cup: 1998

Spain
Summer Olympic Games: 1992

References

External links
 
 
 
 
 
 

1970 births
Living people
Footballers from Barcelona
Spanish footballers
Association football defenders
La Liga players
Segunda División players
Segunda División B players
FC Barcelona C players
FC Barcelona Atlètic players
FC Barcelona players
CD Tenerife players
Premier League players
Chelsea F.C. players
Spain youth international footballers
Spain under-21 international footballers
Spain under-23 international footballers
Spain international footballers
1994 FIFA World Cup players
1998 FIFA World Cup players
Olympic footballers of Spain
Footballers at the 1992 Summer Olympics
Olympic gold medalists for Spain
Olympic medalists in football
Medalists at the 1992 Summer Olympics
Catalonia international footballers
Spanish expatriate footballers
Expatriate footballers in England
Spanish expatriate sportspeople in England
Spanish football managers
Eredivisie managers
SBV Vitesse managers
La Liga managers
Segunda División managers
Córdoba CF managers
RCD Mallorca managers
Spanish expatriate football managers
Expatriate football managers in the Netherlands
Spanish expatriate sportspeople in the Netherlands